A tree tunnel is a road, lane or track where the trees on each side form a more or less continuous canopy overhead, giving the effect of a tunnel.

The effect may be achieved in a formal avenue lined with trees or in a more rural setting with randomly placed trees on each side of the route. 

The British artist David Hockney has painted tree tunnels as a theme, as especially illustrated at a 2012 solo exhibition of his work at the Royal Academy in London, England.
The English landscape artist Nick Schlee has used a tree tunnel as subject matter.

Gallery

See also

 Tunnel of Love (railway), Ukraine
 Tunnel of Trees, Michigan, USA
 Dark Hedges, County Antrim, Northern Ireland 
 Sunken lane
 Vault (architecture)

References

Trees
Tunnels
Road infrastructure
Types of thoroughfares